Jesiel Cardoso Miranda (born 3 May 1994), simply known as Jesiel, is a Brazilian professional footballer who plays for Japanese club Kawasaki Frontale as a centre back.

Club career
Born in São Paulo, Jesiel started his youth career with the academy of Red Bull Brasil and moved to Atlético Mineiro in 2012. Ahead of the 2015 season, he was promoted to the senior team. However, he failed to make any appearance during the campaign.

On 7 February 2016, Jesiel made his first team debut, starting in a 2–1 defeat against Figueirense, in Primeira Liga. To get more playing time and first team experience, he joined Série B side Bragantino on loan on 16 February. However, he returned to his parent club in June.

In April 2017, Jesiel injured his left thigh during a defeat against Caldense, in Campeonato Mineiro. On 26 June, his contract was extended until 2020.

On 28 December 2017, Jesiel joined Mirassol on a loan deal for the upcoming Campeonato Paulista. On 4 April 2018, he was loaned out to Paraná. He got injured in August and returned to play in the following month.

On 31 December 2018, Jesiel moved to Japanese J1 League side Kawasaki Frontale ahead of the 2019 season, joining on loan until 1 January 2020. His loan became permanent as he joined Kawasaki Frontale in a full transfer. He is a Kawasaki Frontale regular ever since then, having even featured at two J.League Best XI awards, on 2020 and 2021.

In 2023, Jesiel became one of three players appointed as the vice-captains of the club alongside Kyohei Noborizato and Yasuto Wakizaka.

Career statistics

Honours

Club
Kawasaki Frontale
J1 League: 2020, 2021
Emperor's Cup: 2020
Japanese Super Cup: 2021

Individual
J.League Best XI: 2020, 2021

References

External links

1994 births
Living people
Association football defenders
Brazilian footballers
Campeonato Brasileiro Série A players
Campeonato Brasileiro Série B players
J1 League players
Clube Atlético Mineiro players
Clube Atlético Bragantino players
Mirassol Futebol Clube players
Paraná Clube players
Kawasaki Frontale players
Brazilian expatriate footballers
Expatriate footballers in Japan
Brazilian expatriate sportspeople in Japan
Footballers from São Paulo